"Ulan" is the first single released by Filipino rock band Rivermaya and also the first single released on their debut self-titled album in 1995. The song was produced by Chito S. Roño and Lizza G. Nakpil.

The song was written by rhythm guitarist and keyboardist Rico Blanco and Nathan Azarcon, the band's bassist. Blanco's keyboard solo was featured on the instrumental break. On the intro, the guitars were played by Blanco and Perf de Castro.

Personnel
Bamboo Mañalac: vocals
Rico Blanco: keyboards, rhythm guitar, backing vocals
Perf de Castro: lead guitar
Nathan Azarcon: bass guitar
Mark Escueta: drums, percussion

Cover versions
The song was covered by Janine Teñoso for the 2019 film of the same name.

References

1994 songs
1995 debut singles
Rivermaya songs
Songs about weather
Songs written by Rico Blanco
Tagalog-language songs